Ice–albedo feedback is a positive feedback climate process where a change in the area of ice caps, glaciers, and sea ice alters the albedo and surface temperature of a planet. Ice is very reflective, therefore it reflects far more solar energy back to space than the other types of land area or open water. Ice–albedo feedback plays an important role in global climate change. For instance, at higher latitudes, warmer temperatures melt the ice sheets. However, if warm temperatures decrease the ice cover and the area is replaced by water or land, the albedo would decrease. This increases the amount of solar energy absorbed, leading to more warming.  The change in albedo acts to reinforce the initial alteration in ice area leading to more warming. Warming tends to decrease ice cover and hence decrease the albedo, increasing the amount of solar energy absorbed and leading to more warming. In the geologically recent past, the ice–albedo positive feedback has played a major role in the advances and retreats of the Pleistocene (~2.6 Ma to ~10 ka ago) ice sheets.  Inversely, cooler temperatures increase ice, which increases albedo, leading to more cooling.

Significance

Current 

Snow– and ice–albedo feedback have a substantial effect on regional temperatures. In particular, the presence of ice cover makes the North Pole and the South Pole colder than they would have been without it. Consequently, recent Arctic sea ice decline is one of the primary factors behind the Arctic warming nearly four times faster than the global average since 1979 (the year when continuous satellite readings of the Arctic sea ice began)., in a phenomenon known as Arctic amplification. Modelling studies show that strong Arctic amplification only occurs during the months when significant sea ice loss occurs, and that it largely disappears when the simulated ice cover is held fixed. Conversely, the high stability of ice cover in Antarctica, where the thickness of the East Antarctic ice sheet allows it to rise nearly 4 km above the sea level, means that this continent has not experienced any net warming over the past seven decades: ice loss in the Antarctic and its contribution to sea level rise is instead driven entirely by the warming of the Southern Ocean, which had absorbed 35–43% of the total heat taken up by all oceans between 1970 and 2017.

Ice–albedo feedback also has a smaller, but still notable effect on the global temperatures. Arctic ice decline between 1979 and 2011 is estimated to have been responsible for 0.21 watts per square meter (W/m2) of radiative forcing, which is equivalent to a quarter of radiative forcing from CO2 increases over the same period. When compared to cumulative increases in greenhouse gas radiative forcing since the start of the Industrial Revolution, it is equivalent to the estimated 2019 radiative forcing from nitrous oxide (0.21 W/m2), nearly half of 2019 radiative forcing from methane (0.54 W/m2) and 10% of the cumulative CO2 increase (2.16 W/m2).

Future 
The impact of ice-albedo feedback on temperature will intensify in the future as the Arctic sea ice decline is projected to become more pronounced, with a likely near-complete loss of sea ice cover (falling below 1 million km2) at the end of the Arctic summer in September at least once before 2050 under all climate change scenarios, and around 2035 under the scenario of continually accelerating greenhouse gas emissions. Since September marks the end of the Arctic summer, it also represents the nadir of sea ice cover in the present climate, with an annual recovery process beginning in the Arctic winter. Consecutive ice-free Septembers are considered highly unlikely in the near future, but their frequency will increase with greater levels of global warming: a 2018 paper estimated that an ice-free September would occur once in every 40 years under a warming of 1.5 degrees Celsius, but once in every 8 years under 2 degrees and once in every 1.5 years under 3 degrees. This means that the loss of Arctic sea ice during September or earlier in the summer would not be irreversible, and in the scenarios where global warming begins to reverse, its annual frequency would begin to go down as well. As such, it is not considered one of the tipping points in the climate system.

Notably, while the loss of sea ice cover in September would be a historic event with significant implications for Arctic wildlife like polar bears, its impact on the ice-albedo feedback is relatively limited, as the total amount of solar energy received by the Arctic in September is already very low. On the other hand, even a relatively small reduction in June sea ice extent would have a far greater effect, since June represents the peak of the Arctic summer and the most intense transfer of solar energy. CMIP5 models estimate that a total loss of Arctic sea ice cover from June to September would increase the global temperatures by 0.19 degrees Celsius, with a range of 0.16–0.21 °C, while the regional temperatures would increase by over 1.5 degrees. This estimate includes not just the ice-albedo feedback itself, but also its second-order effects such the impact of such sea ice loss on lapse rate feedback, the changes in water vapor concentrations and regional cloud feedbacks. Since these calculations are already part of every CMIP5 and CMIP6 model, they are also included in their warming projections under every climate change pathway, and do not represent a source of "additional" warming on top of their existing projections.

Very high levels of global warming could prevent Arctic sea ice from reforming during the Arctic winter. Unlike an ice-free summer, this ice-free Arctic winter may represent an irreversible tipping point. It is most likely to occur at around 6.3 degrees Celsius, though it could potentially occur as early as 4.5 °C or as late as 8.7 °C.  While the Arctic sea ice would be gone for an entire year, it would only have an impact on the ice-albedo feedback during the months where sunlight is received by the Arctic - i.e. from March to September. The difference between this total loss of sea ice and its 1979 state is equivalent to a trillion tons of CO2 emissions - around 40% of the 2.39 trillion tons of cumulative emissions between 1850 and 2019, although around a quarter of this impact has already happened with the current sea ice loss. Relative to now, an ice-free winter would have a global warming impact of 0.6 degrees, with a regional warming between 0.6 and 1.2 degrees.

Ice–albedo feedback also exists with the other large ice masses on the Earth's surface, such as mountain glaciers, Greenland ice sheet, West Antarctic and East Antarctic ice sheet. However, their large-scale melt is expected to take centuries or even millennia, and any loss in area by the end of the 21st century will be negligible. Thus, climate change models do not include them in their projections of 21st century climate change: experiments where they model the disappearance of those ice masses indicate that the total loss of the Greenland Ice Sheet adds 0.13 °C to global warming (with a range of 0.12–0.14 °C), while the loss of the West Antarctic Ice Sheet adds 0.05 °C (0.04–0.06 °C), and the loss of mountain glaciers adds 0.08 °C (0.07–0.09 °C). Since the East Antarctic ice sheet is expected to take a minimum of 10,000 years to disappear entirely even under very high (5-10 degrees) warming, with the maximum impact of around 0.6 degrees. Total loss of the Greenland ice sheet would increase regional temperatures in the Arctic by between 0.5 and 3 degrees, while the regional temperature in Antarctica is likely to go up by 1 degree after the loss of the West Antarctic ice sheet and 2 degrees after the loss of the East Antarctic ice sheet.

As land ice melts and causes eustatic sea level rise, it can also potentially induce earthquakes as a result of post-glacial rebound, which further disrupts glaciers and ice shelves.

Snowball Earth 
The runaway ice–albedo feedback was also important for the Snowball Earth. Geological evidence show glaciers near the equator, and models have suggested the ice–albedo feedback played a role. As more ice formed, more of the incoming solar radiation was reflected back into space, causing temperatures on Earth to drop. Whether the Earth was a complete solid snowball (completely frozen over), or a slush ball with a thin equatorial band of water still remains debated, but the ice–albedo feedback mechanism remains important for both cases.

Ice–albedo feedback on exoplanets 
On Earth, the climate is heavily influenced by interactions with solar radiation and feedback processes. One might expect exoplanets around other stars to also experience feedback processes caused by stellar radiation that affect the climate of the world. In modeling the climates of other planets, studies have shown that the ice–albedo feedback is much stronger on terrestrial planets that are orbiting stars (see: stellar classification) that have a high near-ultraviolet radiation.

See also
Climate change feedback
Climate sensitivity
Dark Snow Project
Polar amplification
Polar see-saw – phenomenon where temperature variations at each of Earth's poles may not be in phase
Soil carbon feedback

References

External links
 

Climate change feedbacks
Effects of climate change